University is an album by the American alternative rock band Throwing Muses, released in 1995. It contains the single "Bright Yellow Gun", the band's first national hit.

The album peaked at No. 10 on the UK Albums Chart; it peaked at No. 10 on Billboard'''s Heatseekers Albums chart. Sales were too low for Sire, and the band was dropped from its roster, ending the Muses' major label years.

Production
The album was recorded in the fall of 1993, right before lead Muse Kristin Hersh recorded her first solo album, Hips and Makers. 4AD founder Ivo Watts-Russell convinced Hersh to release the solo album first, in early 1994; University was delayed until 1995. The band's former roadie, Bernard Georges, played bass on the album.

Critical receptionThe Independent called University "a gorgeous album in parts: it's the most tuneful, coherent and least witchy music Hersh has yet delivered in her Muses hat." The Knoxville News Sentinel deemed "Bright Yellow Gun" a "too-traditional rocker." The Boston Globe'' determined that the album "finds the band and Hersh in good, raw form, mixing up formally inventive songs with sidelong hooks and expressionistic lyrics."

Track listing
All songs by Kristin Hersh.

"Bright Yellow Gun"  – 3:43
"Start"  – 2:47
"Hazing"  – 3:14
"Shimmer"  – 3:14
"Calm Down, Come Down"  – 1:48
"Crabtown"  – 4:20
"No Way in Hell"  – 4:44
"Surf Cowboy"  – 2:45
"That's All You Wanted"  – 3:26
"Teller"  – 2:52
"University"  – 2:12
"Snakeface"  – 3:29
"Flood"  – 3:14
"Fever Few"  – 6:44

References

Throwing Muses albums
1995 albums
4AD albums
Reprise Records albums
Sire Records albums